Welcome to North Korea (Dutch: Noord-Korea) is a 2001 Dutch documentary film directed by Peter Tetteroo and Raymond Feddema for KRO Television. The film won an International Emmy in 2001 for best documentary.

References

External links 
 Welcome to North Korea at IMDb

2001 films
2001 documentary films
Dutch documentary films
Documentary films about North Korea